Brianna Beahan (born 1 November 1991) is an Australian track and field athlete who specializes in the 100 metres hurdles. She won a gold medal in 100 metres hurdles at the 2019 Oceania Athletics Championships in Townsville. Representing Australia at the 2019 World Athletics Championships, she reached the semi finals in women's 100 metres hurdles.

Personal life
Beahan was born in Joondalup, and is educated at the Edith Cowan University in Perth, Western Australia.

References

External links
 
 Brianna Beahan at Athletics Australia

Australian female hurdlers
1991 births
Living people
World Athletics Championships athletes for Australia
Athletes from Perth, Western Australia
Edith Cowan University alumni